Red Gulch Dinosaur Tracksite is an assemblage of fossil dinosaur footprints on public land near Shell, in Big Horn County, Wyoming.

They were discovered in 1997 by Erik P. Kvale, a research geologist from the Indiana Geological Survey.

The site is managed by the Bureau of Land Management as part of the Red Gulch/Alkali National Back Country Byway and is open to the public.

Fossils
The fossilized tracks are believed to have been made during the Middle Jurassic Period, 160-180 million years b.p., on what was then a shore of the Sundance Sea. Theropod tracks are thought to be among those discovered, but evidence suggests that the tracks were made by a large, diverse group of dinosaurs. Due to a rarity of Middle Jurassic theropods, the species that made the tracks is currently unknown. The majority of the footprints are in the area dubbed "the ballroom".

Besides the trackways, a variety of fossils can be found, including belemnites, crinoids, and shrimp burrows.

Geology
The tracksite is in a limestone layer in the lower part of the Sundance Formation.  Its discovery was somewhat surprising, since the Sundance was historically considered to be marine in nature.  Indeed, the layer just above the tracksite contains abundant marine fossils including numerous Gryphaea nebrascensis, indicating that later in the Jurassic it was once again submerged.

See also

Sundance Formation
Fossil trackway
Sundance Sea

References

External links
 BLM Wyoming.gov: official Red Gulch Dinosaur Tracksite website
 BLM Wyoming.gov: "Red Gulch Dinosaur Tracksite, An Ancient Shoreline Comes to Light"
 BLM Wyoming.gov: Red Gulch photo gallery
 Geo-sciences.com: Red Gulch Dinosaur Tracksite – Wyoming’s Middle Jurassic Treasure
 State University of New York at Stony Brook.edu: Red Gulch Dinosaur Tracksite photo gallery

Fossil trackways in the United States
Fossil parks in the United States
Jurassic geology of Wyoming
Jurassic paleontological sites of North America
Paleontology in Wyoming
1997 in paleontology
Protected areas of Big Horn County, Wyoming
Bureau of Land Management areas in Wyoming